Salahuddin Ahmed Mukti is a Bangladeshi politician. He was the member of Bangladesh Parliament from Mymensingh-5 during 2014 to 2019.

Early life
Mukti was born on 2 January 1973. He has a S.S.C. degree.

Career
Mukti was elected to Parliament from Mymensingh-5 as a Jatiya Party candidate in 2014.

References

Living people
10th Jatiya Sangsad members
1973 births
Jatiya Party politicians